Connor James may refer to:

 Connor James (ice hockey), a Canadian hockey player
 Connor James (soccer), a Canadian soccer player

See also
 Connor James Chatham
 James Connor (disambiguation)
 James Conner (disambiguation)